Mega Disasters is an American documentary television series that originally aired from May 23, 2006 to July 2008 on The History Channel. Produced by Creative Differences, the program explores potential catastrophic threats to individual cities, countries, and the entire globe.

The two "mega-disasters" of the 2004 Indian Ocean tsunami and Hurricane Katrina in 2005 inspired the series and provided a reference point for many of the episodes. Excepting only two shows devoted to man-made disasters, the threats explored can be divided into three general categories: meteorological, geological, and cosmic hazards.

The Series mostly airs on Viceland.

Format
Each episode of the series generally follows this pattern:
An introduction teasing the catastrophic outcome of the threat.
A background on the science and scientists warning about the threat.
A presentation of previous similar disasters.
A recap of the evidence.
A hypothetical scenario using 3D computer animation to visually depict the details of a potential disaster.

Episodes

Season 1 (2006)

Season 2 (2007)

Season 3 (2008)

See also
It Could Happen Tomorrow, a similar television series on The Weather Channel
Perfect Disaster, another worst-case scenario series on the Discovery Channel

Notes

References

External links

History (American TV channel) original programming
Documentary films about disasters
Documentary television series about industry
Documentary television series about technology
2006 American television series debuts
2008 American television series endings
2000s American documentary television series
English-language television shows
Disaster television series